"All Watched Over by Machines of Loving Grace" is a 1967 poem by Richard Brautigan.

All Watched Over by Machines of Loving Grace may also refer to:
 All Watched Over by Machines of Loving Grace (poetry collection), a 1967 poetry collection by Richard Brautigan
 All Watched Over by Machines of Loving Grace (TV series), a 2011 British documentary series
 All Watched Over By Machines Of Loving Grace, a 2004 album by Brave Captain
 All Watched Over by Machines of Loving Grace, a 2016 album by Universal Thee

See also 
 Machines of Loving Grace (disambiguation)